The 2021–22 CSA Women's Provincial Programme was the 26th edition of South Africa's provincial one-day cricket tournament. The tournament ran from October 2021 to April 2022, with 16 teams competing in three divisions. North West won the tournament, their fourth one day title.

Competition format
The 16 teams were divided into three divisions: a top division named "Top 6", and two lower divisions, Pools A and B. Teams in Pools A and B played each other team in their group once in a round-robin format, whilst teams in the Top 6 league played each other team in their group twice. Matches were played using a one day format, with 50 overs per side.

The winner of the Top 6 league was crowned the Champions. The winners of Pools A and B played off for promotion. The tournament ran concurrently with the 2021–22 CSA Women's Provincial T20 Competition, with matches played either the day before or day after the corresponding encounter between two teams in the T20 tournament.

The groups worked on a points system with positions being based on the total points. Points were awarded as follows:

Win: 4 points. 
Tie: 3 points. 
Loss: 0 points.
Abandoned/No Result: 2 points.
Bonus Point: 1 bonus point available per match.

Teams

Tables

Top 6

Pool A

Pool B

Promotion play-off

References

CSA Women's Provincial Programme
Domestic cricket competitions in 2021–22
2021–22 South African cricket season
2021 in South African women's sport
2022 in South African women's sport